Ben Falcone (born 11 July 1988) is an Australian professional rugby league footballer who represented Italy in the 2013 Rugby League World Cup.

Playing career

References

1988 births
Living people
Australian rugby league players
Australian people of Italian descent
Sportspeople of Italian descent
Italy national rugby league team players
Souths Logan Magpies players
Rugby league halfbacks
Rugby league players from Sydney